H. O. "Naz" Nazareth (born 1944) is an Indian-born British film maker, writer, journalist and barrister. Resident in London, England, he was co-founder of the film production company Penumbra.

Biography

Born in Bombay, India, of Goan descent, Hubert Oscar Nazareth at the age of 21 in 1965 went to Britain, where he worked at various jobs, including computer programmer. He went on to study philosophy and politics at the University of Kent, and qualified as a barrister. Nazareth experienced racist treatment in searching for work in the UK, and after witnessing the way police harassed his Afro-Caribbean friends while they left him alone he joined the British Black Panther movement.

As well as writing and performing poetry in London, Nazareth worked as a journalist contributing to the radical political magazine The Leveller and to Time Out, where he was later a member of the group that set up the alternative listings magazine City Limits in 1981.

After interviewing Trinidadian director Horace Ové for The Leveller, Nazareth co-wrote with him the script of the television film The Garland (1981), which led to the creation of an independent production company named Penumbra. Alongside Ové and Nazareth, other members of Penumbra Productions included Michael Abbensetts, Lindsay Barrett, Margaret Busby, Farrukh Dhondy, and Mustapha Matura. In 1983 Penumbra Productions made a 60-minute film, Talking History (directed by Nazareth), featuring C. L. R. James in dialogue with E. P. Thompson, and Penumbra  also filmed a series of six of James's lectures, shown on Channel 4 television, the topics being: Shakespeare; cricket; American society; Solidarity in Poland; the Caribbean; and Africa.

Nazareth was producer of the magazine show Sunday East for Channel 4 in the 1980s. He and director Faris Kermani formed the company Azad Productions (1984–1989) with a focus on programmes for people from the Indian subcontinent, such as in 1986 the television documentaries A Fearful Silence in 1986 (about domestic violence in the Asian community), and A Corner of a Foreign Field (directed by Udayan Prasad) on the lives of Pakistanis in the UK. Among the films Nazareth has produced are Suffer the Children (1988, on apartheid South Africa), Doctors and Torture (1990, about medical involvement in torture in Latin America), China Rocks: The Long March of Cui Jian (1991); Bombay and Jazz (1992), and Stories My Country Told Me, on culture and nationalism.

Also a poet, Nazareth published a poetry collection, entitled Lobo, in 1984. In addition to writing for The Leveller, as a journalist he has written for such publications as the New Statesman, New African  and Marxism Today. He is a contributor to Reflected in Water: Writings on Goa (Penguin India, 2006), edited by Jerry Pinto.

Selected filmography
 1981: The Garland (BBC, Play for Today) – co-writer with Horace Ové
 1983: Caribbean (featuring C. L. R. James) – producer
 1983: Talking History (featuring C. L. R. James and E. P. Thompson) – director, producer, researcher
 1983: Cricket (featuring C. L. R. James) – producer
 1983: American Society (featuring C. L. R. James) – producer
 1985: Music Fusion (featuring Imdad Husain and Khomiso Khan) – producer
 1985: Africa (featuring C. L. R. James) – producer
 1985: Khomiso Khan at Camden Lock – producer
 1985: Shakespeare (featuring C. L. R. James) – producer
 1986: A Corner of a Foreign Field (Channel 4) – producer
 1988: Suffer the Children (BBC) – producer
 1990: Doctors and Torture (BBC Inside Story series) – producer
 1991: China Rocks: The Long March of Cui Jian – producer
 1991: Repomen – producer
 1992: Bombay and Jazz (BBC) – writer and director
 1993: The Curry Boys – producer
 1993: Gone to the Dogs – producer
 1996: Stories My Country Told Me – director

References

External links
 "Writers talk: Farrukh Dhondy with H. O. Nazareth", Toronto Public Library. 2014, eVideo.
 “Art in the Age of Black Power, History of Racist Ideas in US”, BBC Radio 3, Free Thinking, 12 July 2017.
 "H. O. Nazareth" at IMDb.
 H. O. Nazareth Filmography at BFI.

Living people
1944 births
Indian emigrants to the United Kingdom
20th-century British journalists
20th-century British poets
20th-century Indian poets
British people of Goan descent
British film producers
British documentary filmmakers
British film directors
British screenwriters
20th-century Indian journalists